Paul Bales is an American director, screenwriter, producer and chief operating officer at The Asylum (from year 2006).

Filmography

Director
 Legion of the Dead (2005) (direct-to-video)

Writer
 Nazis at the Center of the Earth (2012) (direct-to-video)
 2010: Moby Dick (2010) (direct-to-video)
 Sherlock Holmes (2010) (direct-to-video)
 MegaFault (2009) (TV movie)
 100 Million BC (2008) (direct-to-video)
 The Da Vinci Treasure (2006) (direct-to-video)
 Legion of the Dead (2005)
 Killers 2: The Beast (2002) (direct-to-video)
 Reasonable Doubt (2001) (direct-to-video)
 Max Knight: Ultra Spy (2000) (TV movie)

Producer
 Battle Star Wars (2020) (co-producer)
 Zoombies (2016) (co-producer)
 Mercenaries (2014)
 40 Days and Nights (2012)
 Age of the Hobbits (2012)
 Gacy House (2010)

References

External links

American film directors
American film producers
American male screenwriters
American television producers
Living people
Year of birth missing (living people)